The Pontiac Rageous is a 4-door concept car built by Pontiac. It appeared at the 1997 North American International Auto Show.

References

Rageous